Qin Qiang is a Chinese track and field athlete who specialises in the javelin throw.

See also 
China at the 2012 Summer Olympics – Athletics
Athletics at the 2012 Summer Olympics – Men's javelin throw

References 

1983 births
Living people
Athletes from Shandong
Chinese male javelin throwers
Athletes (track and field) at the 2012 Summer Olympics
Olympic athletes of China
Athletes (track and field) at the 2010 Asian Games
Asian Games competitors for China
21st-century Chinese people